Sean McDonald is Executive Editor and Vice President of Farrar, Straus and Giroux and publisher of its experimental imprint, MCD/FSG.

Career
Authors he has edited include Sloane Crosley, Junot Díaz, Nuruddin Farah, James Frey, Gorillaz, Nicola Griffith, Aleksandar Hemon, John Hodgman, Steven Berlin Johnson, Walter Mosley, Tyler Perry, Erik Reece, David Rees, the RZA, George Saunders, John Jeremiah Sullivan, Hector Tobar, and Ellen Ullman.

Prior to FSG, he worked as an Executive Editor and Vice President of Riverhead Books and before that at Nan A. Talese/Doubleday, most notably as editor of James Frey's controversial bestselling memoir A Million Little Pieces.

Awards
In 2003, he was named "It" editor of the year by Entertainment Weekly and a "Power Punk" (influential New Yorkers under 35) by the New York Observer. In 2005 he was named a "Young Turk" of publishing by Publishers Weekly.

External links
Elegant Variation interview
MediaBistro interview

References

American book editors
Living people
Year of birth missing (living people)